Trevor Ryan is an Australian rugby league footballer who played in the 1970s and 1980s.  He played for Balmain, Western Suburbs and Newtown in the New South Wales Rugby League (NSWRL) competition.  Ryan is the father of Matt Ryan who played for Parramatta between 2012 and 2013.

Background
Ryan was born in Bellingen, New South Wales but grew up in Nambucca Heads.  Ryan signed for Balmain as a 17 year old after being scouted by both Western Suburbs and Newtown.

Playing career
Ryan made his first grade debut for Balmain against Western Suburbs at the Sydney Sports Ground in 1972.  

In his first few seasons at Balmain, the club struggled on the field and claimed the wooden spoon in 1974 after coming last.  In 1975, Ryan was appointed as the captain of the Balmain club.  In 1976, Ryan earned his first representative honour being selected to represent NSW City.  

In 1977, Balmain reached the finals series for the first time in a number of years after finishing fourth.  Balmain would reach the semi final but were defeated by Eastern Suburbs 26-2 at the Sydney Cricket Ground.  In 1978, Ryan was selected to play for New South Wales against Queensland.  Ryan departed the club at the end of 1978 after being persuaded by John Singleton to sign with Newtown.

In his two seasons at Newtown, Ryan became a regular in the team but the club failed to reach the finals on both occasions.  In 1981, Ryan departed Newtown and signed with Western Suburbs.  Ryan only played in two first grade matches for Western Suburbs due to a hamstring injury. Ryan returned towards the end of the season and played in the club's reserve grade side which won the premiership against Parramatta.

In 1982, Ryan returned to Balmain and was appointed captain by coach Frank Stanton.  Ryan retired following the conclusion of the 1982 season.

References

1954 births
Living people
Western Suburbs Magpies players
Balmain Tigers captains
Balmain Tigers players
Newtown Jets players
Australian rugby league players
City New South Wales rugby league team players
New South Wales rugby league team players
Rugby league locks
Rugby league second-rows
Rugby league centres
Rugby league players from New South Wales